CSS Columbia was an ironclad steamer ram in the Confederate States Navy and later in the United States Navy.

As CSS Columbia

Columbia was built at Charleston, South Carolina in 1864 to a design by John L. Porter. She was launched in March 1864 and entered service later in that year. When the Union forces took possession of Charleston on 18 February 1865, they found Columbia near Fort Moultrie; she had run on a sunken wreck and been damaged on 12 January 1865. The ironclad already had her cannon and some armor plating removed; ship-worms were already at work boring into her wooden hull.

As USS Columbia
Columbia was drydocked on 5 June and repairs were begun, but on 15 June, she was decommissioned and placed in ordinary. Her hulk was later sold for scrapping on 10 October 1867.

References 
 
 
 
 
 
 
 
 

Ironclad warships of the Confederate States Navy
Ships built in Charleston, South Carolina
1864 ships
Captured ships
Shipwrecks of the American Civil War
Shipwrecks of the Carolina coast
Maritime incidents in January 1865